Árelía Eydís Guðmundsdóttir (born 16 October 1966) is a Reykjavík City Council Member, best-selling Icelandic author, consultant, and Associate Professor of Management and Leadership at University of Iceland. She is the chair of the Gender Equality Council, known for her work on leadership and career.

Biography 
Born in Keflavík, Iceland, the oldest of four children, Árelía attended the University of Iceland where she obtained her B.A. in political science in 1991. She received her M.S. degree in industrial relations and personnel management at the London School of Economics in 1993, and later she studied for a PhD in political science at the University of Essex and the University of Iceland, which she received in 2001.

Awards and recognition 
In 2018. Demystifying Leadership in Iceland: An Inquiry into Cultural, Societal, and Entrepreneurial Uniqueness was nominated as "Book of the Year" by the European Academy of Management which is the largest organization in the field of management in Europe.

Novels 
Árelía Eydís Guðmundsdóttir has written several novels
Sara (2019)
Sterkari í seinni hálfleik (2017)
Tapað fundið (2015)
Á réttri hillu (2011)

Selected publications
Árelía Eydís Guðmundsdóttir has written several books and academic articles on leadership and career. 
 Minelgaite, I., Guðmundsdóttir, S., Guðmundsdóttir, Á.E., Stangej, O. (2018) Demystifying Leadership in Iceland: An Inquiry into Cultural, Societal, and Entrepreneurial Uniqueness, Springer, September 2018.
 Árelía Eydís Guðmundsdóttir. (2012) Móti hækkandi sól, Salka, 2012.
 Árelía Eydís Guðmundsdóttir. (2002) Íslenskur vinnumarkaður á umbrotatímum : sveigjanleiki fyrirtækja, stjórnun og samskipti aðila vinnumarkaðarins, Háskólinn í Reykjavík, 2002.

References

External links 

Árelía Eydís Guðmundsdóttir faculty profile at the University of Iceland
Árelía Eydís Guðmundsdóttir on RUV, The Icelandic National Broadcasting Service
Interview with Árelía Eydís Guðmundsdóttir on middle age

1966 births
Living people
Arelia Eydis Gudmundsdottir
Arelia Eydis Gudmundsdottir
Arelia Eydis Gudmundsdottir
Arelia Eydis Gudmundsdottir